City of Durham is a constituency represented in the House of Commons of the UK Parliament since 2019 by Mary Foy of the Labour Party.

Constituency profile
The constituency contains a large minority of students, researchers and academics at the early 19th century founded University of Durham, that has a claim towards being the third oldest in England and has elected Labour MPs since 1935, although there have been strong SDP–Liberal Alliance and Liberal Democrat challenges to Labour since the 1980s.

The constituency corresponds to the former City of Durham local government district and as such includes a number of surrounding villages and suburbs as well as Durham itself, the largest of these are Brandon, Coxhoe, Bowburn, Framwellgate Moor, Sherburn and Ushaw Moor. The seat extends as far west as Waterhouses and as far east as Ludworth. The seat has traditionally been dominated by Labour, with support particularly strong in those villages historically connected to County Durham's mining industry. Durham is famous as an educational centre, for Durham University and the feepaying preparatory school, Chorister School where Tony Blair was educated. The city centre is more inclined to the Liberal Democrats. Like many other university cities such as Cambridge and Oxford, in the 2005 election it swung strongly towards the Liberal Democrats, one possible reason being these cities' sizeable student population who were viewed as being hostile to Labour's policies on areas such as top-up fees and the Iraq War. The Liberal Democrats were able to reduce Labour's majority by over 10,000 votes, although they were still unable to gain the seat from Labour, as was the case in the 2010 election. As reflected in throughout the country, the Liberal Democrat vote collapsed in the 2015 election.

History

The parliamentary borough (1678–1918)
The City of Durham was first given the right to return Members to Parliament by an Act of Parliament in 1673, although the first election was not held until 1678 due to drafting errors. It was the last new borough but one to be enfranchised before the Great Reform Act of 1832. It was the only borough in County Durham, the county also having been unrepresented until the same Act of Parliament, which created two MPs for the county and two for the city. Both constituencies were frequently referred to simply as Durham, which can make for some confusion.

The constituency as constituted in 1678 consisted only of the city of Durham itself, though this included its suburbs which were within the municipal boundary. The right to vote was held by the corporation and the freemen of the city, many of whom were not resident within the boundaries. Unlike the situation in many small rotten boroughs, the corporation had no jurisdiction over the creation of freemen: freemen were generally created by connection with companies of trade, either by apprenticeship or by birth (by being the son of an existing freeman), though the common council of the city had a power to create honorary freemen.

The creation of honorary freemen with the specific intention of swaying elections was a common abuse in a number of boroughs in the 18th century, and at the Durham election of 1762 became sufficiently controversial to force a change in the law. The election was disputed because 215 new freemen, most of them not resident in the city, had been made after the writ for the election was issued. The existing freemen petitioned against this dilution of their voting rights, the candidate who had been declared elected was unseated by the Commons committee which heard the case, and the following year an Act of Parliament was passed to prevent any honorary freeman from voting in a borough election within twelve months of their being accorded that status.

Through having a freeman franchise the electorate was comparatively numerous for the period, though comprising only a small fraction of the city's population; at the time of the Reform Act there were between 1,100 and 1,200 freemen in total, of whom 427 were resident and 558 lived within seven miles, while the total population of the borough was 9,269. The Lambton and Tempest families were influential, and were generally able to secure election, but fell far short of the sort of control common in pocket boroughs.

The city retained both its MPs under the 1832 Reform Act, with its boundaries adjusted only very slightly, although as elsewhere the franchise was reformed. The Reform Act 1867 extended the boundaries to include part of Framwellgate parish which had previously been excluded. Under the Redistribution of Seats Act 1885, the borough's representation was reduced from the 1885 general election to a single MP. In the boundary changes of 1918, the borough was abolished, but a division of County Durham was named after the city.

County constituency (since 1918)
From 1918, Durham City was included in a county constituency officially called The Durham Division of (County) Durham, consisting of the central part of the county. In the 1983 boundary changes, the constituency officially acquired the unambiguous City of Durham name for the first time and its boundaries were realigned to match the new City of Durham local government district.

Historic and current boundaries (county constituency)

1918–1950 
 the Borough of Durham
 the Urban District of Hetton
 the Rural District of Durham except the parish of Brancepeth
 in the Rural District of Houghton-le-Spring, the parishes of East Rainton, Great Eppleton, Little Eppleton, Moor House, Moorsley, and West Rainton.
As well as absorbing the abolished parliamentary borough, the reconstituted seat included Hetton-le-Hole and surrounding rural areas, transferred from Houghton-le-Spring, and northern areas of the abolished Mid Division of Durham.

1950–1974 
 the Borough of Durham
 the Urban Districts of Hetton and Spennymoor
 the Rural District of Durham.
Spennymoor and the parish of Brancepeth transferred in from the abolished constituency of Spennymoor. Other minor changes (the Rural District of Houghton-le-Spring had been abolished and absorbed into neighbouring local authorities).

1974–1983 
 the Borough of Durham and Framwelgate
 the Rural District of Sedgefield and the Rural District of Durham except the parish of Brancepeth.
Hetton transferred back to Houghton-le-Spring, and Spennymoor and Brancepeth now included in Durham North West. Gained the Rural District of Sedgefield from the abolished constituency of Sedgefield.

1983-present 

 The City of Durham.
Sedgefield returned to the re-established constituency thereof. Gained the area comprising the former Urban District of Brandon and Byshottles which had been absorbed into the District of the City of Durham, previously part of North West Durham.

2007 boundary review 
Following a review of parliamentary representation in County Durham in 2007, the Boundary Commission for England made no changes to the City of Durham constituency, which remains coterminous with the boundaries of the former district. The City of Durham local council was abolished in the 2009 structural changes to local government in England, but the boundaries of the constituency have not been changed.

Members of Parliament

Durham City (borough)
 Constituency created 1678

MPs 1678–1885

MPs 1885–1918

Durham, Durham/City of Durham (county constituency)

MPs since 1918

Elections

Elections in the 2010s

Elections in the 2000s

Elections in the 1990s

Elections in the 1980s

Elections in the 1970s

Elections in the 1960s

Elections in the 1950s

Election in the 1940s

Elections in the 1930s

Elections in the 1920s

Elections in the 1910s

Elections in the 1900s

Elections in the 1890s

 Caused by Fowler's death.

 These are the final 1895 results after a recount. The original result was Fowler with 1,111 votes, and Elliot with 1,110 votes, leaving a Liberal majority of just one vote.

Elections in the 1880s

 

 Caused by Herschell's appointment as Solicitor General for England and Wales

Elections in the 1870s

 
 
 

 Caused by the 1874 election being declared void on petition.

 
 

 

 Caused by Davison's death.

 

 Caused by Davison's appointment as Judge Advocate General of the Armed Forces.

Elections in the 1860s

 

 

 

 Caused by Mowbray's appointment as Judge Advocate General of the Armed Forces

 

 Caused by Atherton's death.

 Caused by Atherton's appointment as Attorney General for England and Wales.

 Caused by Atherton's appointment as Solicitor General for England and Wales.

Elections in the 1850s

 

 

 Caused by Mowbray's appointment as Judge Advocate General of the Armed Forces.

 

 
 

 Caused by the earlier by-election being declared void on petition due to bribery.

 
 

 Caused by Granger's death.

Elections in the 1840s

 

 

 
 

 Caused by the by-election being declared void on petition due to bribery by Hill-Trevor's agents.

 

 Caused by FitzRoy's appointment as Governor of New Zealand

Elections in the 1830s

 

 

 

 

 
 

 
 

 
 
 

 Caused by Gresley being unseated on petition.

See also 
 List of parliamentary constituencies in County Durham
 History of parliamentary constituencies and boundaries in Durham

Notes

References

Sources
 F W S Craig, "British Parliamentary Election Results 1832-1885" (2nd edition, Aldershot: Parliamentary Research Services, 1989)
 J Holladay Philbin, "Parliamentary Representation 1832 - England and Wales" (New Haven: Yale University Press, 1965)
 Michael Kinnear, "The British Voter" (London: Batsford, 1968)
 E Porritt and AG Porritt, "The Unreformed House of Commons, Vol I: England and Wales" (Cambridge: Cambridge University Press, 1903)
 Henry Stooks Smith, The Parliaments of England from 1715 to 1847 (2nd edition, edited by FWS Craig - Chichester: Parliamentary Reference Publications, 1973)
 Robert Waller, "The Almanac of British Politics" (3rd edition, London: Croom Helm, 1987)
 Frederic A Youngs, jr, "Guide to the Local Administrative Units of England, Vol II" (London: Royal Historical Society, 1991)
 The Constitutional Yearbook, 1913" (London: National Unionist Association, 1913)

External links 
nomis Constituency Profile for City of Durham — presenting data from the ONS annual population survey and other official statistics.

Parliamentary constituencies in County Durham
1678 establishments in England
Politics of Durham, England